David Fynn is a British-Irish actor, producer and screenwriter, best known for playing Brett in the NBC TV sitcom Undateable.

He began playing Dewey Finn in the West End cast of Andrew Lloyd Webber's musical School of Rock (based on the 2003 film with Jack Black) in October 2016 at the New London Theatre, for which he received an Olivier Award nomination for Best Actor in a Musical in 2017.

Theatre 
His theatre credits include She Stoops to Conquer at the National Theatre (Evening Standard Nomination), Romeo and Juliet at the National Theatre,  The 25th Annual Putnam County Spelling Bee at the Donmar Warehouse, Mojo at the Royal Shakespeare Company, After the Party in the West End and Starving at Theatre 503. He trained at Webber Douglas Academy of Dramatic Art.

Television 
His other television appearances include Game of Thrones, Sherlock, Doctor Who, The Inbetweeners, The Job Lot, Banana, Big Bad World, Mayday, Black Mirror, Life’s Too Short, Pete versus Life, Peep Show, and Spooks. In January 2021 he appeared as one of the lead characters, journalist Jonathan Hill, in the ITV miniseries The Pembrokeshire Murders. In 2022 he played the part of a journalist in ITV’s ‘’The Thief, his Wife and the Canoe’’, and Alex in BBC’s ‘’Am I Being Unreasonable?’’.

References

External links
 

21st-century Irish male actors
Irish male stage actors
Irish male television actors
Living people
Year of birth missing (living people)
Place of birth missing (living people)